The Australian and New Zealand Association for the Advancement of Science (ANZAAS) is an organisation that was founded in 1888 as the Australasian Association for the Advancement of Science to promote science.

It was modelled on the British Association for the Advancement of Science. For many years, its annual meetings were a popular and influential way of promoting science in Australia and New Zealand.

The current name has been used since 1930.

History
Two of its founders include Archibald Liversidge and Horatio George Anthony Wright.

In the 1990s, membership and attendance at the annual meetings decreased as specialised scientific societies increased in popularity. Proposals to close the Association were discussed, but it continued after closing its office in Adelaide. It now operates on a smaller scale but is beginning to grow. The Annual Meetings are no longer held.

It holds lectures, for the medals and for other named lectures, both nationally and at state level.

Each year it organises Youth ANZAAS, an annual residential scientific forum attended by senior secondary students from Australian schools and High schools.

Awards
The Association awards two important medals; the Mueller medal, named in honour of Ferdinand von Mueller, botanist and pioneer environmentalist, and the ANZAAS medal.

ANZAAS Medal
The ANZAAS medal is awarded annually for services in the advancement of science or administration and organisation of scientific activities, or the teaching of science throughout Australia and New Zealand and in contributions to science which lie beyond normal professional activities.

Sculptor Andor Meszaros designed the Medal, which was first awarded in 1965.

Recipients

Mueller Medal

The Medal is awarded annually to a scientist who is the author of important contributions to anthropological, botanical, geological or zoological science, preferably with special reference to Australia. It is named after Ferdinand von Mueller, the German/Australian botanist who was Director of the Royal Botanic Gardens, Melbourne. Initiated in 1902, it was designed by Walter Baldwin Spencer.

Recipients

Youth ANZAAS

Youth ANZAAS is an annual residential scientific forum for senior Australasian secondary school students from Years 9, 10, 11 and 12. This event is designed to provide students with a broad perspective on the aims and practice of scientific endeavour, ranging from satisfying curiosity and the drive to discover, to the application of science in the real world. It gives students the opportunity to visit world-class facilities where cutting edge research is undertaken and meet leading scientists.

Recent forums have been:

Programs

ANZAAS – Australian Synchrotron Inaugural Winter School 

The ANZAAS – Australian Synchrotron Inaugural Winter School was launched in July 2009. The four-day program aims to give young researchers – Honours, Masters and early PhD students – an understanding of synchrotron techniques and operation for research purposes. Participants attend lectures, tour the facility and perform beamline experiments that complement their lectures.

Publications

Report of the ... meeting of the Australasian Association for the Advancement of Science, Australia and New Zealand. 1888–1930 

 1st Meeting ...   Sydney, New South Wales.  August–September 1888  –   Conference President – H.C. Russell Digital Copy at archive.org
 2nd Meeting ...   Melbourne, Victoria. January 1890  –   Conference President – Baron Sir Ferdinand Jacob Heinrich von Mueller Digital Copy at archive.org
 3rd Meeting ...  Christchurch, New Zealand. January 1891  –   Conference President – Sir James Hector Digital Copy at archive.org
 4th Meeting ...  Hobart, Tasmania. January 1892  –  Conference President – Sir Robert G.C. Hamilton Digital Copy at archive.org
 5th Meeting ...  Adelaide, South Australia. September 1893  –  Conference President  –  Prof Ralph Tate Digital Copy at archive.org
 6th Meeting ...  Brisbane, Queensland. January 1895  –   Conference President  –  Sir Augustus Charles Gregory
 7th Meeting ...  Sydney, New South Wales. January 1898  –   Conference President  –  Prof. Archibald Liversidge Digital Copy at archive.org
 8th Meeting ...  Melbourne, Victoria. January 1900  –   Conference President  – Lt Col. Robert L.J. Ellery Digital Copy at archive.org
 9th Meeting ...  Hobart, Victoria. January 1902  –   Conference President  –  Captain Frederick Hutton Digital Copy at archive.org
 10th Meeting ...  Dunedin, New Zealand. January 1904  –   Conference President  –    Sir Tannatt William Edgeworth David Digital Copy at archive.org
 11th Meeting ...  Adelaide, South Australia. January 1907  –   Conference President  –  Alfred William Howitt Digital Copy at archive.org
 12th Meeting ...  Brisbane, Queensland. January 1909  –   Conference President  –    Sir William Henry Bragg Digital Copy at archive.org
 13th Meeting ...  Sydney, New South Wales. January 1911  –   Conference President  –    Sir David Orme Masson  Digital Copy at archive.org
 14th Meeting ...  Melbourne, Victoria. January 1913  –   Conference President  –    Sir Tannatt William Edgeworth David Digital Copy at archive.org
 15th Meeting ...  Hobart, Tasmania. January 1921  –   Conference President  –    Sir Walter Baldwin Spencer Digital Copy at archive.org
 16th Meeting ...  Wellington, New Zealand. January 1923  –   Conference President  –  Sir George Handley Knibbs
 17th Meeting ...  Adelaide, South Australia. August 1924  –   Conference President  –   General Sir John Monash
 18th Meeting ...  Perth, Western Australia. August 1926  –   Conference President  –   Prof. Edward Henry Rennie
 19th Meeting ...  Hobart, Tasmania. January 1928  –   Conference President  – Richard Hind Cambage
 20th Meeting ...  Brisbane, Queensland. May–June 1930  –   Conference President  – Ernest Clayton Andrews

Report of the ... meeting of the Australian and New Zealand Association for the Advancement of Science.  1930–1997 

 21st Meeting ...  Sydney, New South Wales. August 1932  –   Conference President –  Sir John Hubert Plunkett Murray
 22nd Meeting ...  Melbourne, Victoria. January 1935  –   Conference President – Sir Douglas Mawson
 23rd Meeting ...  Auckland, New Zealand. January 1937  –   Conference President – Sir Albert Cherbury David Rivett
 24th Meeting ...  Canberra, ACT. January 1939  –   Conference President – Sir Ernest Scott
 25th Meeting ...  Adelaide, South Australia. August 1940 / August 1946  –   Conference President – Prof. P. Marshall  Digital Copy at archive.org
 26th Meeting ...  Perth, Western Australia. August 1947  –   Conference President – Prof. A. E. V. Richardson
 27th Meeting ...  Hobart, Tasmania. January 1949  –   Conference President – Arthur Bache Walkom
 28th Meeting ...  Brisbane, Queensland. 1951  –   Conference President – Professor Emeritus Sir Kerr Grant
 29th Meeting ...  Sydney, New South Wales. August 1952  –   Conference President – Sir Douglas Berry Copland
 30th Meeting ...  Canberra, ACT. January 1954  –   Conference President – Sir Theodore Rigg
 31st Meeting ...  Melbourne, Victoria. August 1955  –   Conference President – Sir Richard van der Riet Woolley
 32nd Meeting ...  Dunedin, New Zealand. 1957  –   Conference President – Sir Frank Macfarlane Burnet
 33rd Meeting ...  Adelaide, South Australia. August 1958  –   Conference President – Sir Marcus Laurence Elwin Oliphant
 34th Meeting ...  Perth, Western Australia. 1959  –   Conference President – Herbert Cole H.C. Coombs
 35th Meeting ...  Brisbane, Queensland. May–June 1961  –   Conference President – Sir Samuel Macmahon Wadham
 36th Meeting ...  Sydney, New South Wales. 1962  –   Conference President – Sir Noel Stanley Bayliss
 37th Meeting ...  Canberra, ACT. January 1964 –   Conference President – Sir Frederick William George White
 38th Meeting ...  Hobart, Tasmania. 1965  –   Conference President – Sir Rutherford Ness Robertson
 39th Meeting ...  Melbourne, Victoria. 1967  –   Conference President – Sir Fred Joyce Schonell
 40th Meeting ...  Christchurch, New Zealand. 1968  –   Conference President – Prof. Sir John Grenfell Crawford
 41st Meeting ...  Adelaide, South Australia. 1969  –   Conference President – Sir Charles Alexander Fleming
 42nd Meeting ...  Port Moresby, Papua New Guinea. 1970  –   Conference President – Prof. Samuel Warren Carey
 43rd Meeting ...  Brisbane, Queensland. 1971  –   Conference President – Sir Gustav Victor Joseph Nossal
 44th Meeting ...  Sydney, New South Wales. 1972  –   Conference President – Prof. Robert George Ward
 45th Meeting ...  Perth, Western Australia. 1974  –   Conference President – Prof. Eric John Underwood
 46th Meeting ...  Sydney, New South Wales. January 1975  –   Conference President – The Hon. Mr Justice John Halden Wootten
 47th Meeting ...  Hobart, Tasmania. 1976  –   Conference President – Prof. W.D. Barrie
 48th Meeting ...  Melbourne, Victoria. 1977  –   Conference President – Dr Lloyd Evans
 49th Meeting ...  Auckland, New Zealand. 1979  –   Conference President – Dr Keith Leonard Sutherland
 50th Meeting ...  Adelaide, South Australia. 1980  –   Conference President – Prof. Sir Geoffrey Malcolm Badger
 51st Meeting ...  Brisbane, Queensland. 1981  –   Conference President – Dr Graham Wesley Butler
 52nd Meeting ...  Sydney, New South Wales. 1982  –   Conference President – Sir Zelman Cowen
 53rd Meeting ...  Perth, Western Australia. 1983  –   Conference President – Prof. Ralph Owen Slatyer
 54th Meeting ...  Canberra, ACT. 1984  –   Conference President – Sir Gustav Victor Joseph Nossal
 55th Meeting ...  Melbourne, Victoria. 1985  –   Conference President – Sir Edmund Percival Hillary
 56th Meeting ...  Palmerston, New Zealand. 1987  –   Conference President –  Sir David Stuart Beattie
 57th Meeting ...  Townsville, Queensland. 1987  –   Conference President –  Sir Bruce Watson
 58th Meeting ...  Sydney, New South Wales. 1988  –   Conference President – Prof. Geoffrey Norman Blainey
 59th Meeting ...  Hobart, Tasmania. 1990  –   Conference President – Dr. Brian H. Walker
 60th Meeting ...  Adelaide, South Australia. 1991  –   Conference President – Prof. David Boyd
 61st Meeting ...  Brisbane, Queensland. 1992  –   Conference President – Dr. Robyn Williams AM
 62nd Meeting ...  Perth, Western Australia. September 1993  –   Conference President – The Hon. Barry Owen Jones
 63rd Meeting ...  Geelong, Victoria. September 1994
 64th Meeting ...  Newcastle, New South Wales. 1995
 65th Meeting ...  Canberra, ACT. 1996
 66th Meeting ...  Adelaide, South Australia. 1997

A 67th Meeting was scheduled for Hobart in 1998 but did not proceed.

References

Australasian Association for the Advancement of Science (1888–1930) at Australian Science at Work, accessed 28 February 2007
Elkin, A.P. (1962), A Goodly Heritage: ANZAAS Jubilee Science in New South Wales, Sydney, V.C.N. Blight, Government Printer
MacLeod, Roy (1988), The Commonwealth of Science – ANZAAS and the Scientific Enterprise in Australasia 1888–1988, Melbourne, Oxford University Press, .
Williams, Robyn (1997), A New Life for ANZAAS – Ockam's Razor, ABC Radio National. http://www.abc.net.au/radionational/programs/ockhamsrazor/new-life-for-anzaas/3565128

External links

Museum Victoria Archive

Scientific societies based in Australia
Scientific societies based in New Zealand
1888 establishments in Australia